Mike Melinkovich (born January 7, 1942) is a former American football defensive end. He played for the St. Louis Cardinals from 1965 to 1966 and for the Detroit Lions in 1967.

References

1942 births
Living people
American football defensive ends
Washington Huskies football players
St. Louis Cardinals (football) players
Detroit Lions players